Nancy Rebecca Bell-Johnstone (born October 22, 1959) is an American biathlete. She competed in three events at the 1992 Winter Olympics. Born in New York City, Bell-Johnstone grew up skiing in Stowe, Vermont, where she was part of the Mount Mansfield Club, and her parents were local business owners.

References

External links
 

1959 births
Living people
Biathletes at the 1992 Winter Olympics
American female biathletes
Olympic biathletes of the United States
Place of birth missing (living people)
Sportspeople from New York City
Sportspeople from Vermont
21st-century American women